"Melody" is the seventh single by Japanese artist Masaharu Fukuyama. It was released on June 2, 1993.

Track listing
Melody
Baby Baby
Melody (Original karaoke)

Oricon sales chart (Japan)

References

Masaharu Fukuyama songs
1993 singles
1993 songs
Songs written by Masaharu Fukuyama